Heroes is the seventh studio album by Swedish heavy metal band Sabaton. It was released on 6 May 2014. It is the first album to feature the new Sabaton line-up with guitarists Chris Rörland and Thobbe Englund, as well as new drummer Hannes van Dahl. It was produced by Peter Tägtgren in Abyss Studios. The artwork was made by Péter Sallai and the photos were created by Ryan Garrison. The first single To Hell and Back from their album was released digitally on 14 March 2014 and available on iTunes, Nuclear Blast, Amazon and Google Play. The second single Resist And Bite was also released digitally on 2 May 2014, available on iTunes, Nuclear Blast and Amazon.

Pär Sundström said about the album's concept: "Well, I think this is a perfect concept for Sabaton. We decided to go for the idea to write about individuals instead of bigger battles. Individuals who we think basically went beyond their call of duty, put themselves into harm's way for the good of others".

In an interview to the Brazilian Army's official blog, Sundström explained that the idea for the track "Smoking Snakes" came when he was doing some research for the album: "I tried searching for the word 'Helden', which means heroes in German. I then came across the story of the Drei Brasilianischen Helden (Three Brazilian Heroes) and, from that point on, we deepened our research and decided to write the track." On 17 April 2015, the Brazilian 14th Motorized Infantry Brigade Orchestra covered the song as a thanksgiving.

Track listing
All lyrics by Joakim Brodén and Pär Sundström. All music by Joakim Brodén, except "Inmate 4859" by Brodén & Peter Tägtgren, and "Soldier of 3 Armies" by Brodén & Thobbe Englund.

These last two tracks are listed on every other released version of this album.

These last three songs are only featured on the earbook edition, although track #13 is available on Spotify.

Music video 
The song "To Hell and Back" was also made into a music video which was directed by Owe Lingvall and produced by Bengt Larvia. It was uploaded on Nuclear Blast Records main YouTube channel on 15 May, and currently has over 5 million views as of March 2020.

Personnel 
Joakim Brodén   – lead vocals, keyboards
Pär Sundström   – bass, backing vocals
Chris Rörland   – guitars, backing vocals
Thobbe Englund  – guitars, backing vocals
Hannes van Dahl – drums, backing vocals

Release information 
The special limited earbook edition (28x28cm) is housed in a faux leather sleeve including a metal emblem, a signing card and a 5-track bonus CD (only through mailorder).
Limited 500 blue yellow splatter vinyls edition.
Black vinyl edition with six songs on the A-side and six on the B-side of which the last two are bonus tracks: "7734" and "Man Of War".
Limited Digi book edition.
Limited 300 green vinyls edition. The green vinyl edition also comes in a DLP (double LP) format.
Limited edition Clear Numbered Vinyl, LP, Album 100 hand numbered copies with gatefold cover.

Charts

Weekly charts

Year-end charts

Certifications

References 

2014 albums
Sabaton (band) albums
Nuclear Blast albums
Albums produced by Peter Tägtgren